Dhorpatan is a village in Nepal's Baglung District,   3,900 meters elevation in an  east-west valley south of the Dhaulagiri mountain range in the Himalayas. It is the headquarters of Dhorpatan Hunting Reserve. There is a small community of indigenous Kham Magar people as well as Tibetan refugees.

The enclosing valley is drained to the west by the Uttar Ganga, tributary of the Bheri River, which in turn joins the Karnali River. The east-west orientation of Dhorpatan Valley offers an easy—by himalayan standards—route between the Karnali basin of western Nepal and the Gandaki River basin in the center, over a 3,400-meter pass on the watershed 18 km east of the town. This was an historic migration route for Khas people eastward in the late Middle Ages. Ensuing political evolution led to the unification of the Kingdom of Nepal from loose confederations in the Karnali and Gandaki' regions and from other confederations further east.

A seasonal STOL airstrip 1 km to the west serves the valley. Dhorpatan can also be reached from Baglung via Burtibang by bus or jeep, and by jeep from Beni via Myagdi Khola. Dolpa is a few days trek to the north around the western Dhaulagiri range. There are a few homestay lodges serving basic food, tea, coffee and milk. Cottages are available for hunters holding entry and hunting permits. During the summer months large herds of livestock are taken northwards from the Rapti Zone by Kham Magar people for grazing in surrounding pastureland. Animal husbandry, handicrafts and some tourism are the key economic activities of the people in the region.

References 

Populated places in Baglung District
Valleys of Nepal